Phyllotrichum is a genus of flowering plants belonging to the family Sapindaceae.

Its native range is Indo-China.

Species:
 Phyllotrichum mekongense Lecomte

References

Sapindaceae
Sapindaceae genera